Andrew Kerr IV (October 7, 1878 – February 17, 1969) was an American football, basketball, and track and field coach.  He served as the head football coach at Stanford University (1922–1923), Washington & Jefferson College (1926–1928), Colgate University (1929–1946), and Lebanon Valley College (1947–1949), compiling a career college football record of 137–71–14.  His 1932 Colgate team went a perfect 9–0, was not scored upon, and was named a national champion by Parke H. Davis.  Kerr was also the head basketball coach at the University of Pittsburgh for one season (1921–1922) and at Stanford for four seasons (1922–1926), tallying a career college basketball mark of 54–26.  In addition, he coached track and field at Pittsburgh from 1913 to 1921.  Kerr was inducted into the College Football Hall of Fame in 1951.  Colgate's home football stadium, Andy Kerr Stadium, was dedicated in his honor in 1966.

Early years
Andy Kerr was born in Cheyenne, Wyoming, to Andrew and Mary Elizabeth Kerr. His family moved east to Carlisle, Pennsylvania, where Kerr attended secondary school. He attended Dickinson College, where he played baseball and ran track. He then moved to the University of Pittsburgh, where he served as the head track and field coach from 1913 until 1922, as an assistant football coach, and, for one season, the head basketball coach, leading that squad to a 12–8 record in 1921–22. While at Pitt as an assistant football coach also in charge of the freshman football squad, he served as a member of the staff of head coach Glenn Scobey "Pop" Warner.

Football head coaching career
In 1922, Warner accepted the head coaching job at Stanford University. Due to Warner's contractual obligations at Pitt, he sent Kerr to act as Stanford's head coach until his arrival in 1924. Kerr posted an 11–7 record in his two seasons as head and remained with Warner as an assistant for two more seasons.  He also coached the Stanford men's basketball team from 1922 to 1926.

Andy Kerr served as the 23rd head football coach at Colgate University.  He held that position for eighteen seasons, from 1929 until 1946.  His overall coaching record at Colgate was 95–50–7.  Kerr's 95 wins are the second most in program in history.  His 1932 Colgate squad was undefeated, and did not allow a single point all season. The team expected to be invited to play in the Rose Bowl but when Pitt got the invitation instead, he observed that his Colgate team was "undefeated, untied, unscored upon, and uninvited."

Head coaching record

Football

References

External links
 

1878 births
1969 deaths
Colgate Raiders football coaches
Dickinson Red Devils baseball players
Lebanon Valley Flying Dutchmen football coaches
Lebanon Valley College faculty
Pittsburgh Panthers men's basketball coaches
Pittsburgh Panthers football coaches
Pittsburgh Panthers track and field coaches
Stanford Cardinal football coaches
Stanford Cardinal men's basketball coaches
Washington & Jefferson Presidents football coaches
Washington & Jefferson Presidents men's basketball coaches
College men's track and field athletes in the United States
College Football Hall of Fame inductees
People from Carlisle, Pennsylvania
Sportspeople from Cheyenne, Wyoming
Baseball players from Wyoming
Coaches of American football from Wyoming
Coaches of American football from Pennsylvania
Baseball players from Pennsylvania
Basketball coaches from Pennsylvania
Basketball coaches from Wyoming
Track and field people from Pennsylvania
Track and field people from Wyoming